Paseka Franz Motsoeneng (born April 8, 1968), more popularly known as Prophet PFP Motsoeneng or Prophet Mboro, is a South African televangelist and self proclaimed leader of Incredible Happenings Ministries with its main church based in Katlegong, East Rand of Johannesburg, South Africa.

On March 3, 2014, Paseka Motsoeneng was the subject of a BBC documentary  by Reggie Yates called The Millionaire Preacher: Reggie Yates' Extreme South Africa.

Controversies

In 2011, according to a report on IOL, the pastor had allegedly removed demons by inserting his hands on his congregants vagina. It is alleged that Motsoeneng healed people from erectile dysfunction and wanted them having sex to be broadcast on television, but this was censored and not aired.

Motsoeneng who went against Prophet Bushiri of the ECG Church in court, when investors claimed to have been conned, Mostoeneng was caught up in the web of lies trying to fight for "Justice and the truth". Which led to the arrest of Bushiri who has since fled crying foul of the South African Justice system.

In 2021 Motsoeneng was almost left under the bridge, after ABSA bank threatened to auction his house due to non-payment of loans. Motsoeneng claimed that ABSA Bank had been fraudulently stealing money from his account amounting to over R3 Million, according to Motsoeneng. The news left everyone shocked after Motsoeneng had purchased a BMW i8, which is said to valued at R1,2 Million.

References

External links

1968 births
Living people
Faith healers
Television evangelists
South African Christians